The 236th Fighter-Bomber Aviation Squadron (Serbo-Croatian:  / 236. ловачко-бомбардерска авијацијска ескадрила) was an aviation squadron of Yugoslav Air Force established in April 1961 as part of  88th Fighter-Bomber Aviation Regiment.

It was equipped with US-made Republic F-84G Thunderjet jet fighter-bomber aircraft.

By the end of year 1964 the 88th Fighter-Bomber Aviation Regiment has been disbanded. The 236th Fighter-Bomber Aviation Squadron was also disbanded. Its personnel and equipment were attached to 235th Fighter-Bomber Aviation Squadron.

Assignments
88th Fighter-Bomber Aviation Regiment (1961-1964)

Bases stationed
Batajnica (1961-1964)

Equipment
Republic F-84G Thunderjet (1961–1964)

References

Yugoslav Air Force squadrons
Military units and formations established in 1961
Military units and formations disestablished in 1964